The Han Chinese or Han people, are an East Asian ethnic group native to China. They constitute the world's largest ethnic group, making up about 18% of the global population and consisting of various subgroups speaking distinctive varieties of the Chinese language. The estimated 1.4 billion Han Chinese people worldwide are primarily concentrated in the People's Republic of China (including Mainland China, Hong Kong, and Macau), where they make up about 92% of the total population. In Taiwan, they make up about 97% of the population. People of Han Chinese descent also make up around 75% of the total population of Singapore.

Originating from Northern China, the Han Chinese trace their ancestry to the Huaxia, a confederation of agricultural tribes that lived along the Yellow River. This collective Neolithic confederation included agricultural tribes Hua and Xia, hence the name. They settled along the Central Plains around the middle and lower reaches of the Yellow River in Northern China. These tribes were the ancestors of the modern Han Chinese people who gave birth to Chinese civilization. Within the course of the Warring States period led to the emergence of the early discernible consciousness of the Zhou-era Chinese referring to themselves as being Huaxia (literally, "the beautiful grandeur"), which was distinctively used to adumbrate a "civilized" culture in contrast to what were perceived as "barbaric" towards the adjacent and adjoining vicinities bordering the Zhou Kingdoms that were inhabited by different non-Han Chinese peoples around them. In many overseas Chinese communities, the term Hua people or Huazu is used for people of Han Chinese ethnicity as distinct from Zhongguo Ren which has connotations and implications to being citizens of China, including people of non-Han Chinese ethnicity.

The Huaxia tribes in Northern China continuously expanded into Southern China over the past two millennia, via military conquests and colonisation. Huaxia culture spread southward from its heartland in the Yellow River Basin, absorbing various non-Han ethnic groups that became sinicised over the centuries at various points in China's history.

The name "Han people" first appeared in the Northern and Southern Dynasties, inspired by the Han dynasty, which is considered to be one of the first golden ages in Chinese history. As a unified and cohesive empire, Han China became ancient East Asia's most influential geopolitical power player, projecting much of its hegemony onto its neighbours and was comparable with the contemporary Roman Empire in population size, geographical and cultural reach. The Han dynasty's prestige and prominence influenced many of the ancient Huaxia to begin identifying themselves as "The People of Han." To this day, the Han Chinese have since taken their ethnic name from this dynasty and the Chinese script is referred to as "Han characters".

Names

The name Han was derived from the name of the eponymous dynasty, which succeeded the short-lived Qin dynasty and is historically considered to be the first golden age of China's Imperial era due to the power and influence it projected over much of East Asia. As a result of the dynasty's prominence in inter-ethnic and pre-modern international influence, Chinese people began identifying themselves as the "people of Han", a name that has been carried down to this day. Similarly, the Chinese language also came to be named the "Han language" ever since. On Oxford Dictionaries, the Han are defined as "The dominant ethnic group in China". In the Encyclopedia of the Peoples of Asia and Oceania, the Han are called the dominant population in "China, as well as in Taiwan and Singapore". According to the Merriam-Webster Dictionary, the Han are "the Chinese peoples especially as distinguished from non-Chinese (such as Mongolian) elements in the population".

The Han dynasty's founding emperor, Liu Bang, was made king of the Hanzhong region after the fall of the Qin dynasty, a title that was later shortened to "the King of Han" during the Chu–Han Contention. The name "Hanzhong", in turn, was derived from the Han River, which flows through the region's plains.

Prior to the Han dynasty, ancient Chinese scholars used the term Huaxia ("the magnificent Xia") in texts to describe China proper, while the Chinese populus were referred to as either the "various Hua" (Zhūhuá) or the "various Xia" (Zhūxià). This gave rise to a term commonly used nowadays by overseas Chinese as an ethnic identity for the Chinese diaspora – Huaren ("ethnic Chinese people"), Huaqiao ("the Chinese immigrant" meaning overseas Chinese) as well as a literary name for China – Zhonghua ("Central China"). Zhonghua refers more to the culture of Chinese people, although it may also be seen as equivalent to Zhonghua minzu. Some overseas Chinese communities use Huaren or Huaqiao instead of Zhongguoren, which to them, has connotations to being citizens of the People's Republic of China, due to their political views about the state.

Among some southern Han Chinese varieties such as Cantonese, Hakka and Minnan, a different term exists – Tang Chinese (literally "the people of Tang"), derived from the later Tang dynasty, regarded as another zenith of Chinese civilization. The term is used in everyday conversation and is also an element in one of the words for Chinatown: "street of the Tang people". The phrase ,  is also used to describe the same area).

Population

Distribution

Mainland China 

The vast majority of Han Chinese – over 1.2 billion – live in areas under the jurisdiction of the People's Republic of China (PRC), where they constitute about 92% of its overall population. Han Chinese in China have been a culturally, economically and politically dominant majority vis-à-vis the non-Han minorities throughout most of China's recorded history. Han Chinese are almost the majority in every Chinese province, municipality and autonomous region except for the autonomous regions of Xinjiang (38% or 40% in 2010) and Tibet Autonomous Region (8% in 2014), where Uighurs and Tibetans are the majority, respectively.

Hong Kong and Macau 

Han Chinese also constitute the majority in both of the special administrative regions of the PRC – about 92.2% and 88.4% of the population of Hong Kong and Macau, respectively. The Han Chinese in Hong Kong and Macau have been culturally, economically and politically dominant majority vis-à-vis the non-Han minorities.

Taiwan 

There are over 22 million Han Chinese in Taiwan. At first, these migrants chose to settle in locations that bore a resemblance to the areas they had left behind in mainland China, regardless of whether they arrived in the north or south of Taiwan. Hoklo immigrants from Quanzhou settled in coastal regions and those from Zhangzhou tended to gather on inland plains, while the Hakka inhabited hilly areas. Clashes between these groups over land, water and cultural differences led to the relocation of some communities and, as time passed, varying degrees of intermarriage and assimilation took place. In Taiwan, Han Chinese (including both the earlier Han Taiwanese settlers and the recent Mainland Chinese that arrived in Taiwan with Chiang Kai-shek in 1949) constitute over 95% of the population. They have also been a politically, culturally and economically dominant majority vis-à-vis the non-Han indigenous Taiwanese peoples.

Southeast Asia 

Nearly 30 to 40 million people of Han Chinese descent live in Southeast Asia. According to a population genetic study, Singapore is "the country with the biggest proportion of Hans" in Southeast Asia. Singapore is the only country in the world where Overseas Chinese constitute a majority of the population and remain a cultural, economic and politically dominant majority vis-à-vis the non-Han minorities. Up until the past few decades, overseas Han communities originated predominantly from areas in Southern China (especially the Guangdong, Fujian and Zhejiang areas).

Others 

The total "overseas Chinese" population worldwide number some 60 million people. Han Chinese have settled in numerous countries across the globe, particularly within the Western World where nearly 4 million people of Han Chinese descent live in the United States (about 1.5% of the population), over 1 million in Australia (5.6%) and about 1.5 million in Canada (5.1%), nearly 231,000 in New Zealand (4.9%), and as many as 750,000 in Sub-Saharan Africa.

History

Because of the overwhelming numerical and cultural dominance of Han culture in China, most of the written history of China can be read as "a history of the Han Chinese".

Prehistory 

The prehistory of the Han Chinese is closely intertwined with both archaeology, biology, historical textual records and mythology.  The ethnic stock to which the Han Chinese originally trace their ancestry from were confederations of late Neolithic and early Bronze Age agricultural tribes known as the Huaxia that lived along the Guanzhong and Yellow River basins in Northern China. In addition, numerous ethnic groups were assimilated and absorbed by the Han Chinese at various points in China's history. Like many modern ethnic groups, the ethnogenesis of Han Chinese was a lengthy process that involved the expansion of the Chinese dynasties and their assimilation of various non-Chinese ethnic groups that became sinicised over the centuries.

Writers during the Western Zhou and Han dynasties derived ancestral lineages based on Shang dynasty-era legendary materials, while the Han dynasty historian Sima Qian's Records of the Grand Historian places the reign of the Yellow Emperor, the legendary leader of Youxiong tribes, at the beginning of Chinese history. The Yellow Emperor is traditionally credited to have united with the neighbouring Shennong tribes after defeating their leader, the Yan Emperor, at the Battle of Banquan. The newly merged Yanhuang tribes then combined forces to defeat their common enemy from the east, Chiyou of the Jiuli tribes, at the Battle of Zhuolu and established their cultural dominance in the Central Plain region. To this day, modern Han Chinese refer themselves as "Descendants of Yan and Huang".

Although study of this period of history is complicated by the absence of contemporary records, the discovery of archaeological sites has enabled a succession of Neolithic cultures to be identified along the Yellow River. Along the central reaches of the Yellow River were the Jiahu culture (c. 7000 to 6600 BCE), the Yangshao culture (c. 5000 to 3000 BCE) and the Longshan culture (c. 3000 to 2000 BCE). Along the lower reaches of the river were the Qingliangang culture (c. 5400 to 4000 BCE), the Dawenkou culture (c. 4300 to 2500 BCE) and the Yueshi culture (c. 1900 to 1500 BCE).

Early history 

Early ancient Chinese history is largely legendary, consisting of mythical tales intertwined with sporadic annals written centuries to millennia later. Sima Qian's Records of the Grand Historian  recorded a period following the Battle of Zhuolu, during the reign of successive generations of confederate overlords known as the Three Sovereigns and Five Emperors (c. 2852–2070 BCE), who, allegedly, were elected to power among the tribes.  This is a period for which scant reliable archaeological evidence exists – these sovereigns are largely regarded as cultural heroes.

Xia dynasty 

The first dynasty to be described in Chinese historical records is the Xia dynasty (c. 2070–1600 BCE), established by Yu the Great after Emperor Shun abdicated leadership to reward Yu's work in taming the Great Flood. Yu's son, Qi, managed to not only install himself as the next ruler, but also dictated his sons as heirs by default, making the Xia dynasty the first in recorded history where genealogical succession was the norm.  The civilizational prosperity of the Xia dynasty at this time is thought to have given rise to the name "Huaxia" ("the magnificent Xia"), a term that was used ubiquitously throughout history to define the Chinese nation.

Conclusive archaeological evidence predating the 16th century BCE is, however, rarely available.  Recent efforts of the Xia–Shang–Zhou Chronology Project drew the connection between the Erlitou culture and the Xia dynasty, but scholars could not reach a consensus regarding the reliability of such history.

Shang dynasty 

The Xia dynasty was overthrown after the Battle of Mingtiao, around 1600 BCE, by Cheng Tang, who established the Shang dynasty (c. 1600–1046 BCE).  The earliest archaeological examples of Chinese writing date back to this period – from characters inscribed on oracle bones used for divination – but the well-developed characters hint at a much earlier origin of writing in China.

During the Shang dynasty, people of the Wu area in the Yangtze River Delta were considered a different tribe, and described as being scantily dressed, tattooed and speaking a distinct language. Later, Taibo, elder uncle of Ji Chang – on realising that his younger brother, Jili, was wiser and deserved to inherit the throne – fled to Wu and settled there. Three generations later, King Wu of the Zhou dynasty defeated King Zhou (the last Shang king), and enfeoffed the descendants of Taibo in Wu – mirroring the later history of Nanyue, where a Chinese king and his soldiers ruled a non-Han population and mixed with locals, who were sinicized over time.

Zhou dynasty 

After the Battle of Muye, the Shang dynasty was overthrown by Zhou (led by Ji Fa), which had emerged as a western state along the Wei River in the 2nd millennium BCE.  The Zhou dynasty shared the language and culture of the Shang people, and extended their reach to encompass much of the area north of the Yangtze River.  Through conquest and colonization, much of this area came under the influence of sinicization and this culture extended south.  However, the power of the Zhou kings fragmented not long afterwards, and many autonomous vassal states emerged.  This dynasty is traditionally divided into two eras – the Western Zhou (1046–771 BCE) and the Eastern Zhou (770–256 BCE) – with the latter further divided into the Spring and Autumn (770–476 BCE) and the Warring States (476–221 BCE) periods.  It was a period of significant cultural and philosophical diversification (known as the Hundred Schools of Thought) and Confucianism, Taoism and Legalism are among the most important surviving philosophies from this era.

Imperial history

Qin dynasty 

The chaotic Warring States period of the Eastern Zhou dynasty came to an end with the unification of China by the western state of Qin after its conquest of all other rival states under King Ying Zheng. King Zheng then gave himself a new title "First Emperor of Qin", setting the precedent for the next two millennia. To consolidate administrative control over the newly conquered parts of the country, the First Emperor decreed a nationwide standardization of currency, writing scripts and measurement units, to unify the country economically and culturally. He also ordered large-scale infrastructure projects such as the Great Wall, the Lingqu Canal and the Qin road system to militarily fortify the frontiers.  In effect, he established a centralized bureaucratic state to replace the old feudal confederation system of preceding dynasties, making Qin the first imperial dynasty in Chinese history.

This dynasty, sometimes phonetically spelt as the "Ch'in dynasty", has been proposed in the 17th century by Martino Martini and supported by later scholars such as Paul Pelliot and Berthold Laufer to be the etymological origin of the modern English word "China".

Han dynasty 

The reign of the first imperial dynasty was to be short-lived. Due to the First Emperor's autocratic rule and his massive labor projects, which fomented rebellion among the populace, the Qin dynasty fell into chaos soon after his death. Under the corrupt rule of his son and successor Huhai, the Qin dynasty collapsed a mere three years later. The Han dynasty (206 BC–220 CE) then emerged from the ensuing civil wars and succeeded in establishing a much longer-lasting dynasty.  It continued many of the institutions created by the Qin dynasty, but adopted a more moderate rule. Under the Han dynasty, arts and culture flourished, while the Han Empire expanded militarily in all directions. Many Chinese scholars such as Ho Ping-ti believe that the concept (ethnogenesis) of Han ethnicity, though an ancient one, was formally entrenched in the Han dynasty. The Han dynasty is considered one of the golden ages of Chinese history, and to this day, the modern Han Chinese people have since taken their ethnic name from this dynasty and the Chinese script is referred to as "Han characters".

Three Kingdoms to Tang 

The fall of the Han dynasty was followed by an age of fragmentation and several centuries of disunity amid warfare among rival kingdoms. During this time, areas of northern China were overrun by various non-Han nomadic peoples, which came to establish kingdoms of their own, the most successful of which was Northern Wei (established by the Xianbei). Starting from this period, the native population of China proper began to be referred to as Hanren, or the "People of Han", to distinguish them from the nomads from the steppe. Warfare and invasion led to one of the first great migrations of Han populations in history, as they fled south to the Yangzi and beyond, shifting the Chinese demographic center and speeding up sinicization of the far south. At the same time most of the nomads in northern China came to be sinicized as they ruled over large Chinese populations and adopted elements of their culture and administration. Of note, the Xianbei rulers of Northern Wei ordered a policy of systematic sinicization, adopting Han surnames, institutions and culture.

The Sui (581–618) and Tang (618–907) dynasties saw the continuation of the complete sinicization of the south coast of what is now China proper, including what are now the provinces of Fujian and Guangdong. The later part of the Tang era, as well as the Five Dynasties period that followed, saw continual warfare in north and central China; the relative stability of the south coast made it an attractive destination for refugees.

Song to Qing 

The next few centuries saw successive invasions of Han and non-Han peoples from the north. In 1279, the Mongols conquered all of China, becoming the first non-Han ethnic group to do so, and established the Yuan dynasty. The Mongols divided society into four classes, with themselves occupying the top class and Han Chinese into the bottom two classes. Emigration, seen as disloyal to ancestors and ancestral land, was banned by the Song and Yuan dynasties.

In 1644, the Ming capital, Beijing, was captured by Li Zicheng's peasant rebels and the Chongzhen Emperor committed suicide. The Manchus of the Qing dynasty then allied with former Ming general Wu Sangui and seized control of Beijing. Remnant Ming forces led by Koxinga fled to Taiwan and established the Kingdom of Tungning, which eventually capitulated to Qing forces in 1683. Taiwan, previously inhabited mostly by non-Han aborigines, was sinicized during this period via large-scale migration accompanied by assimilation, despite efforts by the Manchus to prevent this, as they found it difficult to maintain control over the island. In 1681, the Kangxi Emperor ordered construction of the Willow Palisade to prevent Han Chinese migration to the three northeastern provinces, which nevertheless had harbored a significant Chinese population for centuries, especially in the southern Liaodong area. The Manchus designated Jilin and Heilongjiang as the Manchu homeland, to which the Manchus could hypothetically escape and regroup if the Qing dynasty fell. Because of increasing Russian territorial encroachment and annexation of neighboring territory, the Qing later reversed its policy and allowed the consolidation of a demographic Han majority in northeast China.

Culture and society

China is one of the world's oldest and most complex civilizations, whose culture dates back thousands of years. Overseas Han Chinese maintain cultural affinities to Chinese territories outside of their host locale through ancestor worship and clan associations, which often identify famous figures from Chinese history or myth as ancestors of current members. Such patriarchs include the Yellow Emperor and the Yan Emperor, who according to legend lived thousands of years ago and gave Han people the sobriquet "Descendants of Yan and Huang Emperor", a phrase which has reverberative connotations in a divisive political climate, as in that of between Mainland China and Taiwan. 

Chinese art, Chinese architecture, Chinese cuisine, Chinese dance, Chinese fashion, Chinese festivals, Chinese holidays, Chinese language, Chinese literature, Chinese music, Chinese mythology, Chinese numerology, Chinese philosophy, and Chinese theatre all have undergone thousands of years of development, while numerous Chinese sites, such as the Great Wall and the Terracotta Army, are World Heritage Sites. Since the start of the program in 2001, aspects of Chinese culture have been listed by UNESCO as Masterpieces of the Oral and Intangible Heritage of Humanity. Throughout the history of China, Chinese culture has been heavily influenced by Confucianism. Credited with shaping much of Chinese thought, Confucianism was the official philosophy throughout most of Imperial China's history, institutionalizing values like filial piety, which implied the performance of certain shared rituals. Thus, villagers lavished on funeral and wedding ceremonies that imitated the Confucian standards of the Emperors. Mastery of Confucian texts provided the primary criterion for entry into the imperial bureaucracy, but even those degree-holders who did not enter the bureaucracy or who left it held increased social influence in their home areas, contributing to the homogenizing of Han Chinese culture. Other factors contributing to the development of a shared Han culture included urbanization and geographically vast but integrated commodity markets.

Language 

Han Chinese speak various forms of the Chinese language that are descended from a common early language; one of the names of the language groups is Hanyu, literally the "Han language". Similarly, Chinese characters, used to write the language, are called Hanzi or "Han characters".

In the late imperial period, more than two-thirds of the Han Chinese population used a variant of Mandarin Chinese as their native tongue. However, there was a larger variety of languages in certain areas of Southeast China, like Shanghai, Guangzhou and Guangxi. Since the Qin dynasty, which standardized the various forms of writing that existed in China, a standard literary Chinese had emerged with vocabulary and grammar that was significantly different from the various forms of spoken Chinese. A simplified and elaborated version of this written standard was used in business contracts, notes for Chinese opera, ritual texts for Chinese folk religion and other daily documents for educated people.

During the early 20th century, written vernacular Chinese based on Mandarin dialects, which had been developing for several centuries, was standardized and adopted to replace literary Chinese. While written vernacular forms of other varieties of Chinese exist, such as written Cantonese, written Chinese based on Mandarin is widely understood by speakers of all varieties and has taken up the dominant position among written forms, formerly occupied by literary Chinese. Thus, although residents of different regions would not necessarily understand each other's speech, they generally share a common written language, Standard Written Chinese and Literary Chinese (these two writing styles can merge into a 半白半文 writing style).

From the 1950s, Simplified Chinese characters were adopted in mainland China and later in Singapore and Malaysia, while Chinese communities in Hong Kong, Macau, Taiwan and overseas countries continue to use Traditional Chinese characters. Although significant differences exist between the two character sets, they are largely mutually intelligible.

Names 

In China, the notion of hundred surnames is crucial identity point of Han people.

Fashion 

Han Chinese clothing has been shaped through its dynastic traditions as well as foreign influences. Han Chinese clothing showcases the traditional fashion sensibilities of Chinese clothing traditions and forms one of the major cultural facets of Chinese civilization. Hanfu or traditional Han clothing comprises all traditional clothing classifications of the Han Chinese with a recorded history of more than three millennia until the end of the Ming Dynasty. During the Qing dynasty, Hanfu clothing was mostly replaced by the Manchu style until the dynasty's fall in 1911, yet Han women continued to wear clothing from Ming dynasty. Manchu and Han fashions of women's clothing coexisted during the Qing dynasty. Moreover, neither Taoist priests nor Buddhist monks were required to wear the queue by the Qing; they continued to wear their traditional hairstyles, completely shaved heads for Buddhist monks, and long hair in the traditional Chinese topknot for Taoist priests. During the Republic of China period, fashion styles and forms of traditional Qing costumes gradually changed, influenced by fashion sensibilities from the Western World resulting modern Han Chinese wearing Western style clothing as a part of everyday dress.

Han Chinese clothing is influential to traditional East Asian fashion as both the Japanese Kimono and the Korean Hanbok were influenced by Han Chinese clothing designs.

Family 
Han Chinese families throughout China have had certain traditionally prescribed roles, such as the family head (jiāzhǎng), who represents the family to the outside world and the family manager (dāngjiā), who is in charge of the revenues. Because farmland was commonly bought, sold or mortgaged, families were run like enterprises, with set rules for the allocation (fēnjiā) of pooled earnings and assets.

Han Chinese houses differ from place to place. In Beijing, the whole family traditionally lived together in a large rectangle-shaped house called a siheyuan. Such houses had four rooms at the front – guest room, kitchen, lavatory and servants' quarters. Across large double doors was a wing for the elderly in the family. This wing consisted of three rooms: a central room where the four tablets – heaven, earth, ancestor and teacher – were worshipped and two rooms attached to the left and right, which were bedrooms for the grandparents. The east wing of the house was inhabited by the eldest son and his family, while the west wing sheltered the second son and his family. Each wing had a veranda; some had a "sunroom" made with surrounding fabric and supported by a wooden or bamboo frame. Every wing was also built around a central courtyard that was used for study, exercise or nature viewing.

Food 

There is no specific one uniform cuisine of the Han people since the food eaten varies from Sichuan's famously spicy food to Guangdong's dim sum and fresh seafood. Analyses have revealed their main staple to be rice and noodles (different kinds of wheat foods). During China's Neolithic period, southwestern rice growers transitioned to millet from the northwest, when they could not find a suitable northwestern ecology – which was typically dry and cold – to sustain the generous yields of their staple as well as it did in other areas, such as along the eastern Chinese coast.

Literature 

Han Chinese have a rich history of classical literature dating back three thousand years. Important early works include classic texts such as Classic of Poetry, Analects of Confucius, I Ching, Tao Te Ching and the Art of War. Some of the most important Han Chinese poets in the pre-modern era include Li Bai, Du Fu and Su Dongpo. The most important novels in Chinese literature, otherwise known as the Four Great Classical Novels, are: Dream of the Red Chamber, Water Margin, Romance of the Three Kingdoms and Journey to the West. Chinese literature continues to have an international reputation with Liu Cixin's San Ti series receiving international acclaim.

Science and technology 

Han Chinese have influenced and contributed to the development of human progress throughout history in many fields and domains including culture, business, science and technology and politics both historically and in the modern era. The invention of paper, printing, the compass and gunpowder are celebrated in Chinese culture as the Four Great Inventions. Medieval Han Chinese astronomers were also among the first peoples to record observations of a cosmic supernova in 1054 AD. The work of medieval Chinese polymath Shen Kuo (1031–1095) of the Song dynasty theorized that the sun and moon were spherical and wrote of planetary motions such as retrogradation as well postulating theories for the processes of geological land formation.

Throughout much of history, successive Chinese dynasties have exerted enormous influence on its East Asian neighbors in the areas of culture, education, politics, science and technology and business. In modern times, Han Chinese form the largest ethnic group in China, while an overseas Han Chinese diaspora numbering in the tens of millions has settled in and contributed to the growth and development of their respective host countries throughout the world.

In the contemporary era, Han Chinese have continued to contribute to the growth and development of modern science and technology. Among such prominently illustrious names highly respected for their past contributory accomplishments are Nobel Prize recipients Tu Youyou, Steven Chu, Samuel C.C. Ting, Chen Ning Yang, Tsung-Dao Lee, Yuan T. Lee, Daniel C. Tsui, Roger Y. Tsien and Charles K. Kao (known as the "Godfather of Broadband" and "Father of Fiber Optics"); Fields Medal winners Terence Tao and Shing-Tung Yau and Turing Award recipient Andrew Yao. Tsien Hsue-shen was a prominent aerospace engineer and rocket scientist who helped to establish NASA's Jet Propulsion Laboratory. The geometer Shiing-Shen Chern was one of the leaders in differential geometry of the 20th century and was awarded the 1984 Wolf Prize in mathematics. The physicist Chien-Shiung Wu, nicknamed the "First Lady of Physics" contributed to the Manhattan Project and radically altered modern physical theory and changed the accepted view of the structure of the universe. The chemical biologist Chuan He is notable for his work in discovering and deciphering reversible RNA methylation in post-transcriptional gene expression regulation. Chuan is also noteworthy for having invented TAB-seq, a biochemical method that can map 5-hydroxymethylcytosine (5hmC) at base-resolution genome-wide, as well as hmC-Seal, a method that covalently labels 5hmC for its detection and profiling.
Biochemist Chi-Huey Wong is well known for his pioneering research in glycoscience research and developing the first enzymatic method for the large-scale synthesis of oligosaccharides and the first programmable automated synthesis of oligosaccharides. The physical chemist Ching W. Tang, was the inventor of the organic light-emitting diode (OLED) and hetero-junction organic photovoltaic cell (OPV) and is widely considered the "Father of Organic Electronics". Others include David Ho, one of the first scientists to propose that AIDS was caused by a virus, thus subsequently developing combination antiretroviral therapy to combat it. Dr. Ho was named Time magazine Person of the Year in 1996. Min Chueh Chang was the co-inventor of the combined oral contraceptive pill and is known for his pioneering work and significant contributions to the development of in vitro fertilization at the Worcester Foundation for Experimental Biology. Biochemist Choh Hao Li discovered human growth hormone (and subsequently used it to treat a form of dwarfism caused by growth hormone deficiency), beta-endorphin (the most powerful of the body's natural painkillers), follicle-stimulating hormone and luteinizing hormone (the key hormone used in fertility testing, an example is the ovulation home test). Joe Hin Tjio was a cytogeneticist renowned as the first person to recognize the normal number of human chromosomes, a breakthrough in karyotype genetics. The bio-engineer Yuan-Cheng Fung, was regarded as the "Father of modern biomechanics" for pioneering the application of quantitative and analytical engineering principles to the study of the human body and disease. China's system of "barefoot doctors" was among the most important inspirations for the World Health Organization conference in Alma Ata, Kazakhstan in 1978, and was hailed as a revolutionary breakthrough in international health ideology emphasizing primary health care and preventive medicine.

Religion 

Chinese spiritual culture has been long characterized by religious pluralism and Chinese folk religion has always maintained a profound influence. Indigenous Confucianism and Taoism share aspects of being a philosophy or a religion and neither demand exclusive adherence, resulting in a culture of tolerance and syncretism, where multiple religions or belief systems are often practiced in concert with local customs and traditions. Han Chinese culture has for long been influenced by Mahayana Buddhism, while in recent centuries Christianity has also gained a foothold among the population.

Chinese folk religion is a set of worship traditions of the ethnic deities of the Han people. It involves the worship of various extraordinary figures in Chinese mythology and history, heroic personnel such as Guan Yu and Qu Yuan, mythological creatures such as the Chinese dragon or family, clan and national ancestors. These practices vary from region to region and do not characterize an organized religion, though many traditional Chinese holidays such as the Duanwu (or Dragon Boat) Festival, Qingming Festival, Zhongyuan Festival and the Mid-Autumn Festival come from the most popular of these traditions.

Taoism, another indigenous religion, is also widely practiced in both its folk forms and as an organized religion and has influenced Chinese art, poetry, philosophy, music, medicine, astronomy, Neidan and alchemy, cuisine, Neijia and other martial arts and architecture. Taoism was the state religion of the early Han Dynasty and Tang Dynasty and also often enjoyed state patronage under subsequent emperors and dynasties.

Confucianism, although sometimes described as a religion, is a governing philosophy and moral code with some religious elements like ancestor worship. It is deeply ingrained in Chinese culture and was the official state philosophy in China during the Han Dynasty and until the fall of imperial China in the 20th century (though it is worth noting that there is a movement in China today advocating that the culture be "re-Confucianized").

During the Han Dynasty, Confucian ideals were the dominant ideology. Near the end of the dynasty, Buddhism entered China, later gaining popularity. Historically, Buddhism alternated between periods of state tolerance (and even patronage) and persecution. In its original form, certain ideas in Buddhism was not quite compatible with the Chinese cultural values, especially with the Confucian elite, as certain Buddhist values conflicted with Chinese sensibilities. However, through centuries of mutual tolerance, assimilation, adaptation and syncretism, Chinese Buddhism gained an respectable place in the culture. Chinese Buddhism was also influenced by Confucianism and Taoism and exerted influence in turn – such as in the form of Neo-Confucianism and Buddhist influences in Chinese folk religion, such as the cult of Guanyin, who is treated as a Bodhisattva, immortal, goddess or exemplar of Confucian virtue, depending on the tradition. The four largest schools of Han Buddhism (Chan, Jingtu, Tiantai and Huayan) were all developed in China and later spread throughout the Sinosphere.

Though Christian influence in China existed as early as the 7th century, Christianity did not begin to gain a significant foothold in China until the establishment of contact with Europeans during the Ming and Qing dynasties. Christian beliefs often having conflicts with Chinese values and traditions which eventually resulted in the Chinese Rites controversy and a subsequent reduction in Christian influence. Christianity grew considerably following the First Opium War, after which foreign missionaries in China enjoyed the protection of the Western powers and engaged in widespread proselytising.

Historical southward migration of the Han people

The term "Huaxia" was used by Confucius's contemporaries, during the Warring States era, to describe the shared ethnicity of all Chinese; Chinese people called themselves Hua Ren. Southern Han people – such as the Hoklo, Cantonese and Hakka – all claim Northern Chinese origins from ancestors who migrated from Northern China's Yellow River Valley during the 4th to 12th centuries. Hoklo clans living in southeastern coastal China, such as in Chaozhou and Quanzhou–Zhangzhou, originated from northern China's Henan province during the Tang dynasty.

There were several periods of mass migration of Han people to Southeastern and Southern China throughout history.

Vietnam, Guangdong and Yunnan all experienced a major surge in Han Chinese migrants during Wang Mang's reign. Hangzhou's coastal regions and the Yangtze valley were settled in the 4th century by Northern Chinese families from the nobility. Special "commanderies of immigrants" and "white registers" were created for the massive number of Han Chinese of northern origin who moved south during the Eastern Jin dynasty. The southern Chinese aristocracy was formed from the offspring of these migrants; Celestial Masters and the nobility of Northern China subdued the aristocracy of Southern China during the Eastern Jin and Western Jin, particularly in Jiangnan. With the depopulation of the north, due to this migration of Northern Chinese, the south became the most populous region of China.

The Han Chinese "Eight Great Surnames" were eight noble families who migrated from Northern China to Fujian in Southern China due to the uprising of the five barbarians when the Eastern Jin was founded, the Hu, He, Qiu, Dan, Zheng, Huang, Chen and Lin surnames.

Ming dynasty Han Chinese pirate Zheng Zhilong and his son Koxinga's ancestors in the Zheng family originated in Northern China but due to the Uprising of the Five Barbarians and Disaster of Yongjia by the Five Barbarians, the Zheng family were among the Northern Chinese refugees who fled to Southern China and settled in Putian, Fujian. They later moved to Zhangzhou and moved on to Nan'an.

Different waves of migration of aristocratic Chinese from Northern China to the south at different times – with some arriving in the 300s–400s and others in the 800s–900s – resulted in the formation of distinct lineages. During the 700s (Tang dynasty), Han migrants from northern China flooded into the south. Hong Kong history books record migrations of the Song and Tang dynasties to the south, which resulted in Hong Kongers that are descended from ethnic Han settlers that originated from northern China. Since it was during the Tang dynasty that Guangdong was subjected to settlement by Han people, many Cantonese, Hokkien and Teochew call themselves Tang. Several wars in northern China such as the Uprising of the Five Barbarians, An Lushan Rebellion, Huang Chao Rebellion, the wars of the Five Dynasties and Ten Kingdoms and Jin–Song Wars caused a mass migration of Han Chinese from Northern China to Southern China called 衣冠南渡 (yì guān nán dù). These mass migrations led to Southern China's population growth, economic, agricultural and cultural development as it stayed peaceful unlike the north.

The Mongol invasion during the thirteenth century caused an influx of Northern Han Chinese refugees to move south to settle and develop the Pearl River delta.

The first Ming dynasty emperor Zhu Yuanzhang resettled his home city Fengyang and capital Nanjing with people from Jiangnan.

DNA and genetics analysis

The Han Chinese show a close genetic relationship with other modern East Asians such as the Koreans and Yamato. A 2018 research found that Han Chinese are easily genetically distinguishable from Yamato Japanese and Koreans, and the different Han Chinese subgroups are genetically closer to each other than to Koreans and Japanese but are still easily distinguishable from each other. Research published in 2020 found the Japanese population to be overlapped with northern Han.

Comparisons between the Y chromosome single-nucleotide polymorphisms (SNPs) and mitochondrial DNA (mtDNA)  of modern Northern Han Chinese and 3,000 year old Hengbei ancient samples from China's Central Plains show they are extremely similar to each other and show continuity between ancient Chinese of Hengbei and current Northern Han Chinese. This showed that already 3,000 years ago the current northern Han Chinese genetic structure was already formed. The reference population for the Chinese used in Geno 2.0 Next Generation is 81% Eastern Asia, 2% Finland and Northern Siberia, 8% Central Asia, and 7% Southeast Asia & Oceania.

Y-chromosome haplogroup O2-M122 is a common DNA marker in Han Chinese, as it appeared in China in prehistoric times. It is found in at least 36.7% to over 80% of Han Chinese males in certain regions. Other Y-DNA haplogroups that have been found with notable frequency in samples of Han Chinese include O-P203 (15/165 = 9.1%, 47/361 = 13.0%), C-M217 (10/168 = 6.0%, 27/361 = 7.5%, 187/1730 = 10.8%, 20/166 = 12.0%), N-M231 (6/166 = 3.6%, 18/361 = 5.0%, 117/1729 = 6.8%, 17/165 = 10.3%), O-M268(xM95, M176) (54/1147 = 4.7%, 8/168 = 4.8%, 23/361 = 6.4%, 12/166 = 7.2%), and Q-M242 (2/168 = 1.2%, 49/1729 = 2.8%, 12/361 = 3.3%, 48/1147 = 4.2%). However, the mtDNA of Han Chinese increases in diversity as one looks from northern to southern China, which suggests that male migrants from northern China married with women from local peoples after arriving in modern-day Guangdong, Fujian, and other regions of southern China. Despite this, tests comparing the genetic profiles of northern Han, southern Han and southern natives determined that haplogroups O1b-M110, O2a1-M88 and O3d-M7, which are prevalent in southern natives, were only observed in some southern Han (4% on average), but not in northern Han. Therefore, this proves that the male contribution of southern natives in southern Han is limited, assuming that the frequency distribution of Y lineages in southern natives represents that before the expansion of Han culture that started two thousand years ago. In contrast, there are consistent strong genetic similarities in the Y chromosome haplogroup distribution between the southern and northern Chinese population, and the result of principal component analysis indicates almost all Han populations form a tight cluster in their Y chromosome. However, other research has also shown that the paternal lineages Y-DNA O-M119, O-P201, O-P203 and O-M95 are found in both southern Han Chinese and South Chinese minorities, but more commonly in the latter. In fact, these paternal markers are in turn less frequent in northern Han Chinese.  Another study puts Han Chinese into two groups: northern and southern Han Chinese, and it finds that the genetic characteristics of present-day northern Han Chinese was already formed prior to three-thousand years ago in the Central Plain area.

The estimated contribution of northern Han to southern Han is substantial in both paternal and maternal lineages and a geographic cline exists for mtDNA. As a result, the northern Han are the primary contributors to the gene pool of the southern Han. However, it is noteworthy that the expansion process was dominated by males, as is shown by a greater contribution to the Y-chromosome than the mtDNA from northern Han to southern Han. These genetic observations are in line with historical records of continuous and large migratory waves of northern China inhabitants escaping warfare and famine, to southern China. Aside from these large migratory waves, other smaller southward migrations occurred during almost all periods in the past two millennia.  A study by the Chinese Academy of Sciences into the gene frequency data of Han subpopulations and ethnic minorities in China, showed that Han subpopulations in different regions are also genetically quite close to the local ethnic minorities, meaning that in many cases, blood of ethnic minorities had mixed into Han, while at the same time, the blood of Han had also mixed into the local ethnic minorities.

A recent, and to date the most extensive, genome-wide association study of the Han population, shows that geographic-genetic stratification from north to south has occurred and centrally placed populations act as the conduit for outlying ones. Ultimately, with the exception in some ethnolinguistic branches of the Han Chinese, such as Pinghua and Tanka people, there is "coherent genetic structure" in all Han Chinese populace.

Typical Y-DNA haplogroups of present-day Han Chinese include Haplogroup O-M122 and Haplogroup Q-M120, and these haplogroups also have been found (alongside some members of Haplogroup N-M231, Haplogroup O-M95, and unresolved Haplogroup O-M175) among a selection of ancient human remains recovered from the Hengbei archeological site in Jiang County, Shanxi Province, China, an area that was part of the suburbs of the capital (near modern Luoyang) during the Zhou dynasty.

Notes

References

Further reading 

 
 Joniak-Lüthi, Agnieszka (2015). The Han: China's Diverse Majority. Washington, DC: University of Washington Press.  (hardcover).  (paperback: 2017).

External links

 
Ethnic groups officially recognized by China